This is a list of the governors of Punjab state in India since its independence on 15 August 1947. Since 1985, the governor of Punjab has acted as the administrator of Chandigarh as well.

Rajpramukh  of PEPSU (1948-1956)

Source:

Governors of Punjab
 Governor served in Acting capacity 
 Governor holds Additional Charge

See also
 Punjab, India
 Chief Minister of Punjab
 Governor (Indian states)

References

External links

 
Punjab
Governors